Tetratheca nuda is a species of flowering plant in the quandong family that is endemic to Australia.

Description
The species grows as a slender, leafless shrub to 10–40 cm in height. The pink or white flowers appear from August to November.

Distribution and habitat
The range of the species lies within the Jarrah Forest and Swan Coastal Plain IBRA bioregions of south-west Western Australia, on granite outcrops, slopes and plains in the vicinity of the city of Perth, on sandy, lateritic and loam soils.

References

nuda
Eudicots of Western Australia
Oxalidales of Australia
Taxa named by John Lindley
Plants described in 1839